This is a list of all personnel changes for 2023 Indian Premier League.

Retirement

Pre-auction
The BCCI set the deadline of 15 November 2022 5 pm IST for the list of retained and released players before the mini auction.

Transfers

Released players

 REP: Players who were unsold originally in the 2022 auction but were later signed up as a replacement player.

Retained players
The team retentions were announced on 15 November 2022.

Summary

Auction 
The IPL 2023 auction was conducted on 23 December 2022 in Kochi. A total of 405 players were available for auction including 273 Indian and 132 foreign players. 87 places were available to be filled across the ten teams. The first three Indian players in the lists released on 13 December were Mayank Agarwal, Ajinkya Rahane and Ishant Sharma. The first three foreign players were Harry Brook, Joe Root and Rilee Rossouw. It was, however, expected that Ben Stokes would be the main attraction. In the event, the top bid was made for Sam Curran, bought by Punjab Kings for 1,850 lakh.

Sold players

Withdrawn players

Support staff changes

References
18. 

Indian Premier League personnel changes
2023 Indian Premier League